1st seed Máximo González won the first edition of this tournament, defeating Caio Zampieri 6–3, 6–2 in the final.

Seeds

Draw

Finals

Top half

Bottom half

References
 Main Draw
 Qualifying Draw

Tetra Pak Tennis Cup - Singles
2011 Singles